Liu Peng (born 17 October 1989) is a Chinese footballer currently playing as a goalkeeper for Heilongjiang Ice City

Club career
Liu Peng would play for the Tianjin TEDA youth team before being promoted to the senior team at the beginning of the 2010 Chinese Super League season. He would move to second tier club Shenyang Dongjin. Throughout the 2014 China League One season he joined Qingdao Huanghai on a free transfer. He would spend five seasons at Qingdao where he established himself as regular within the team. At the beginning of the 2019 league season he would join top tier club Beijing Renhe and would make his debut in a Chinese FA Cup game on 29 May 2019 that ended in a 5-0 defeat.

Career statistics

References

External links
 

1989 births
Living people
Chinese footballers
Association football goalkeepers
Chinese Super League players
China League One players
China League Two players
Tianjin Jinmen Tiger F.C. players
Shenyang Dongjin players
Qingdao F.C. players
Beijing Renhe F.C. players
Heilongjiang Ice City F.C. players
21st-century Chinese people